Franciane Fischer is a Swiss Paralympic skier who represented Switzerland in Paralympic Alpine skiing at the 1980 Paralympic Winter Games in Geilo. She won two bronze medals.

Career 
At the 1980 Winter Paralympic Games, in Geilo, Fischer finished 3rd in the slalom race in 1:40.92 (on the podium behind Cindy Castellano, gold medal, who finished the race in 1:25.84 and Eva Lemezova, silver medal in 1:39.93), and in giant slalom (Fischer with 2:52.27 finished behind Cindy Castellano in 2:39.58 and Kathy Poohachof in 2:42.58). all in category 3A.

References 

Paralympic bronze medalists for Switzerland